Mansurabad (also Romanized as Manşūrābād) is a village in Kamfiruz-e Jonubi Rural District, Kamfiruz District, Marvdasht County, Fars Province, Iran. At the 2006 census, its population was 397, in 85 families.

References 

Populated places in Marvdasht County